Romantic Classics is a studio album by Julio Iglesias. It was released in 2006 on Columbia Records.

The album contains covers of popular romantic songs of the 1960s, '70s and '80s.

Track listing

Charts

Weekly charts

Year-end charts

Certifications

References

2006 albums
Julio Iglesias albums
Columbia Records albums
Covers albums